HITC (formerly Here Is the City) is a British news and entertainment website owned by GRV Media. As well as multiple social profiles it also has two popular football-themed YouTube channels, HITC Football (previously HITC Sport) and HITC Sevens, launched in October 2014 and June 2017 respectively.

History
At its launch in 2000, HITC was focused on financial news.

In February 2010 it set up a "Save Dave" campaign to save a banker from losing their job after they were caught on live television viewing images of a model in the office. The campaign garnered much publicity within the finance industry.

The company dropped the name Here Is the City in 2015.

The HITC Football (previously HITC Sport) and HITC Sevens YouTube channels were launched in October 2014 and June 2017 respectively. As of the end of 2021, the channels have a combined subscriber base of over 1 million. HITC Football was previously run by Michael Ramsay, who left in 2022 to launch his own channel, The Irish Guy.

Logo

The HITC logo has retained the same font across its history, but utilises variations of the colour and shape to distinguish its sub-brands. For example the HITC Football logo is on a green background, as opposed to the standard red/pink logo.

References

External links
 Official website

Internet properties established in 2000
British entertainment websites